Members of the New South Wales Legislative Council who served in the 54th Parliament were elected at the 2003 and 2007 elections. As members serve eight-year terms, half of the Council was elected in 2003 and did not face re-election in 2007, and the members elected in 2007 did not face re-election until 2015. The President was Peter Primrose until 17 November 2009 and then Amanda Fazio.

References

Members of New South Wales parliaments by term
21st-century Australian politicians
New South Wales Legislative Council